Dine Suzette (born 28 February 1991) is a Seychellois football player who plays for Côte d'Or FC.

International career

International goals
Scores and results list Seychelles' goal tally first.

References

External links 
 

1991 births
Living people
Seychellois footballers
Seychelles international footballers
Association football forwards
Cote d'Or FC players